This page shows results of Canadian federal elections in the Ottawa, Ontario area since the 1979 election.

Regional profile
With the exception of the more conservative rural western and southern parts, the former Region of Ottawa-Carleton which became the new City of Ottawa in 2001, has traditionally been a Liberal heartland. A high proportion of Francophones and civil servants had made ridings such as Ottawa—Vanier among the safest Liberal seats in the country, however, now there are probably only two safe Liberal seats in Ottawa - Ottawa South and Ottawa—Vanier. The NDP's only historical victory in the area, Ottawa Centre in 1984, was repeated in 2004, as their popular former leader Ed Broadbent was elected. The Green Party's best seat in the province also came in Ottawa Centre. The seat was retained in 2006 after Broadbent's retirement, by Paul Dewar (son of former mayor Marion Dewar).

The suburban Ottawa ridings tended to be swing ridings, a trend that was masked until the Canadian Alliance won Carleton-Mississippi Mills (then known as Lanark-Carleton), traditionally the most conservative riding in what was then Ottawa-Carleton.  The Conservatives broke through to take another seat in 2004, and two more in 2006.  They held them until 2015, when the massive Liberal wave that swept through Ontario resulted in the Conservatives being reduced to only one seat.  The Liberals even managed to win Kanata-Carleton, essentially the Ottawa portion of Carleton-Mississippi Mills, with the help of star candidate and retired Air Force officer Karen McCrimmon.

Note, this data is a total for all ridings within the city, plus the portions of ridings that extend outside the city, that are located within Ottawa (Cumberland in Glengarry—Prescott—Russell and all of Carleton—Mississippi Mills except Mississippi Mills). Data within these split ridings does not include votes from people residing outside the riding (prisoners, members or the Canadian forces, or for temporary reasons), or by people voting in mobile polls or by means of special ballots.

Votes by party throughout time

Representation history by area

2021 - 44th General Election 

|-
| style="background-color:whitesmoke" |Carleton
|
|Gustave Roy24,29834.28%
||
|Pierre Poilievre35,35649.89%
|
|Kevin Hua8,16411.52%
|
|Nira Dookeran1,3271.87%
|
|Peter Crawley1,7282.44%
|
|
||
|Pierre Poilievre
|-
| style="background-color:whitesmoke" |Kanata—Carleton
||
|Jenna Sudds26,39441.79%
|
|Jennifer McAndrew24,37338.59%
|
|Melissa Coenraad8,82213.97%
|
|Jennifer Purdy1,7092.71%
|
|Scott Miller1,8582.94%
|
|
||
|Karen McCrimmon$
|-
| style="background-color:whitesmoke" |Nepean
||
|Chandra Arya29,62045.05%
|
|Matt Triemstra22,18433.74%
|
|Sean Devine10,78616.41%
|
|Gordon Kubanek1,3182.00%
|
|Jay Nera1,8402.80%
|
|
||
|Chandra Arya
|-
| style="background-color:whitesmoke" |Orléans
||
|Marie-France Lalonde39,10151.94%
|
|Mary-Elsie Wolfe21,70028.82%
|
|Jessica Joanis10,98314.59%
|
|Michael Hartnett1,2331.64%
|
|Spencer Oklobdzija2,0462.72%
|
|André Junior Cléroux (FPC)2200.29%
||
|Marie-France Lalonde
|-
|rowspan=3 style="background-color:whitesmoke" |Ottawa Centre
|rowspan=3 |
|rowspan=3 |Yasir Naqvi33,82545.50%
|rowspan=3 |
|rowspan=3 |Carol Clemenhagen11,65015.67%
|rowspan=3 |
|rowspan=3 |Angella MacEwen24,55233.03%
|rowspan=3 |
|rowspan=3 |Angela Keller-Herzog2,1152.84%
|rowspan=3 |
|rowspan=3 |Regina Watteel1,6052.16%
|
|Shelby Bertrand (Animal)261 0.35%
|rowspan=3 |
|rowspan=3 |Catherine McKenna$
|-
|
|Richard "Rich" Joyal (Ind.)132 0.18%
|-
|
|Alex McDonald (Comm.)201 0.27%
|-
| style="background-color:whitesmoke" |Ottawa South
||
|David McGuinty29,03848.81%
|
|Eli Tannis15,49726.05%
|
|Huda Mukbil11,51419.35%
|
|Les Schram1,4012.35%
|
|Chylow Hall1,8983.19%
|
|Larry Wasslen (Comm.)1440.24%
||
|David McGuinty
|-
|rowspan=3 style="background-color:whitesmoke" |Ottawa—Vanier
|rowspan=3 |
|rowspan=3 |Mona Fortier28,46249.05%
|rowspan=3 |
|rowspan=3 |Heidi Jensen11,61120.01%
|rowspan=3 |
|rowspan=3 |Lyse-Pascale Inamuco13,70323.61%
|rowspan=3 |
|rowspan=3 |Christian Proulx1,8163.13%
|rowspan=3 |
|rowspan=3 |Jean-Jacques Desgranges1,8553.20%
|
|Crystelle Bourguignon (FPC)179 0.31%
|rowspan=3 |
|rowspan=3 |Mona Fortier
|-
|
|Daniel Elford (Libert.)248 0.43%
|-
|
|Marie-Chantal TaiEl Leriche (Ind.)157 0.27%
|-
| style="background-color:whitesmoke" |Ottawa West—Nepean
||
|Anita Vandenbeld25,88945.10%
|
|Jennifer Jennekens16,47328.70%
|
|Yavar Hameed11,16319.45%
|
|David Stibbe1,6422.86%
|
|David Yeo1,9083.32%
|
|Sean Mulligan (CHP)3270.57%
||
|Anita Vandenbeld
|}

2019 - 43rd General Election 

|-
| style="background-color:whitesmoke" |Carleton
|
|Chris Rodgers26,51838.23%
||
|Pierre Poilievre32,14746.35%
|
|Kevin Hua6,4799.34%
|
|Gordon Kubanek3,4234.94%
|
|Alain Musende7921.14%
|
|
|
|
||
|Pierre Poilievre
|-
| style="background-color:whitesmoke" |Kanata—Carleton
||
|Karen McCrimmon28,74643.05%
|
|Justina McCaffrey24,36136.48%
|
|Melissa Coenraad8,31712.46%
|
|Jennifer Purdy4,3876.57%
|
|Scott Miller9611.44%
|
|
|
|
||
|Karen McCrimmon
|-
| style="background-color:whitesmoke" |Nepean
||
|Chandra Arya31,93345.89%
|
|Brian St. Louis23,32033.51%
|
|Zaff Ansari9,10413.08%
|
|Jean-Luc Cooke4,3796.29%
|
|Azim Hooda6870.99%
|
|Dustan Wang1600.23%
|
|
||
|Chandra Arya
|-
| style="background-color:whitesmoke" |Orléans
||
|Marie-France Lalonde44,18354.27%
|
|David Bertschi22,98428.23%
|
|Jacqui Wiens9,42811.58%
|
|Michelle Petersen3,8294.70%
|
|Roger Saint-Fleur9861.21%
|
|
|
|
||
|Andrew Leslie†$
|-
|rowspan=5 style="background-color:whitesmoke" |Ottawa Centre
|rowspan=5 |
|rowspan=5 |Catherine McKenna38,39148.66%
|rowspan=5 |
|rowspan=5 |Carol Clemenhagen9,92012.57%
|rowspan=5 |
|rowspan=5 |Emilie Taman22,91629.04%
|rowspan=5 |
|rowspan=5 |Angela Keller-Herzog5,8377.40%
|rowspan=5 |
|rowspan=5 |Merylee Sevilla7200.91%
|rowspan=5 |
|rowspan=5 |Stuart Ryan1110.14%
|
|Shelby Bertrand (Animal)207 0.26%
|rowspan=5 |
|rowspan=5 |Catherine McKenna
|-
|
|Coreen Corcoran (Libert.)360 0.46%
|-
|
|Chris G Jones (Ind.)177 0.22%
|-
|
|Marie-Chantal Leriche (CHP)198 0.25%
|-
|
|Giang Ha Thu Vo (Ind.)65 0.08%
|-
|rowspan=2 style="background-color:whitesmoke" |Ottawa South
|rowspan=2 |
|rowspan=2 |David McGuinty34,20552.32%
|rowspan=2 |
|rowspan=2 |Eli Tannis16,02524.51%
|rowspan=2 |
|rowspan=2 |Morgan Gay10,45716.00%
|rowspan=2 |
|rowspan=2 |Les Schram3,6455.58%
|rowspan=2 |
|rowspan=2 |Rodrigo André Bolaños7171.10%
|rowspan=2 |
|rowspan=2 |Larry Wasslen990.15%
|
|Ahmed Bouragba (Ind.)141 0.22%
|rowspan=2 |
|rowspan=2 |David McGuinty
|-
|
|Sarmad Laith (Ind.)87 0.13%
|-
|rowspan=4 style="background-color:whitesmoke" |Ottawa—Vanier
|rowspan=4 |
|rowspan=4 |Mona Fortier32,67951.16%
|rowspan=4 |
|rowspan=4 |Joel E. Bernard11,11817.40%
|rowspan=4 |
|rowspan=4 |Stéphanie Mercier13,51621.16%
|rowspan=4 |
|rowspan=4 |Oriana Ngabirano4,7967.51%
|rowspan=4 |
|rowspan=4 |Paul Durst1,0641.67%
|rowspan=4 |
|rowspan=4 |Michelle Paquette1150.18%
|
|Joel Altman (Ind.)211 0.33%
|rowspan=4 |
|rowspan=4 |Mona Fortier
|-
|
|Christian Legeais (M-L)59 0.09%
|-
|
|Daniel James McHugh (Ind.)94 0.15%
|-
|
|Derek Miller (Rhino.)229 0.36%
|-
|rowspan=3 style="background-color:whitesmoke" |Ottawa West—Nepean
|rowspan=3 |
|rowspan=3 |Anita Vandenbeld28,37845.62%
|rowspan=3 |
|rowspan=3 |Abdul Abdi16,87627.13%
|rowspan=3 |
|rowspan=3 |Angella MacEwen11,64618.72%
|rowspan=3 |
|rowspan=3 |David Stibbe3,8946.26%
|rowspan=3 |
|rowspan=3 |Serguei Guevorkian8391.35%
|rowspan=3 |
|rowspan=3 |Vincent Cama1030.17%
|
|Nick Lin (M-L)48 0.08%
|rowspan=3 |
|rowspan=3 |Anita Vandenbeld
|-
|
|Butch Moore (NA)71 0.11%
|-
|
|Sean Mulligan (CHP)351 0.56%
|}<noinclude>

2015 - 42nd General Election

2011 - 41st General Election

2008 - 40th General Election

Key
Red - Liberal seats 
Blue - Conservative seats
Orange - NDP seats

2006 - 39th General Election

2004 - 38th General Election

2000 - 37th General Election

1997 - 36th General Election

1993 - 35th General Election

1988 - 34th General Election

1984 - 33rd General Election

1980 - 32nd General Election

1979 - 31st General Election

See also
 For earlier results, please see Canadian federal election results in Eastern Ontario.

References

Ottawa
Politics of Ottawa